The Letter of three hundred was a 22-page memorandum signed by about 300 scientists in order to highlight the destruction of Soviet science in general and genetics in particular by the pseudoscientist Trofim Lysenko. It was sent to the Central Committee of the Communist Party of the Soviet Union on October 11, 1955. It resulted in the resignation of T. D. Lysenko from his position as president of the VASKhNIL, despite support for him from Nikita Khrushchev who had taken command after the death of Joseph Stalin. An extract of the letter was first made public in January 13, 1989 by Pravda newspaper but the authors were not made public until 2005. 

The letter highlighted the shame brought to Soviet science by Lysenko and his supporters who travelled and spoke around the world providing what they claimed as food for anti-Soviet propaganda. They noted the speech of N.I. Nuzhdin in Karachi in 1954 and of I.E. Gluschenko in 1950 where ignorance of basic science was demonstrated. The signatories included many Soviet scientists associated with Moscow University including P.S. Alexandrov, L.A. Artsimovich, B.L. Astaurov, Ya.A. Birshtein, V.G. Geptner, M.S. Gilyarov, V.L. Ginzburg, I.N. Vekua, A.G. Voronov, G.P. Dementiev, N.P. Dubinin, L.A. Zenkevich, M.V. Keldysh, L.V. Krushinsky, B.A. Kudryashov, M.A. Lavrentiev, L.D. Landau, G.S. Landsberg, M.A. Leontovich, A.A. Lyapunov, A.I. Markushevich, K.I. Meyer, V.V. Nemytsky, V.V. Popov, Ya.Ya. Roginsky, A.D. Sakharov, S.L. Sobolev, V.N. Sukachev, I.E. Tamm, N.V. Timofeev-Ressovsky, A.N. Tikhonov, S.S. Turov, A.N. Formozov, A.I. Frumkin, A.I. Shalnikov, I.R. Shafarevich, and S.V. Yablonsky. Those who were not affiliated with the university included A.I. Alikhanov, A.I. Alikhanyan, A.N. Bakulev, I.M. Vinogradov, Ya.B. Zeldovich, P.L. Kapitsa, A.B. Migdal, V.S. Nemchinov, I.Ya. Pomeranchuk, Yu.B. Khariton, S.A. Khristianovich, G.N. Flerov. The draft of the letter was examined and approved by I. V. Kurchatov and A.N. Nesmeyanov who were members of the central committee who could not sign it on account of the positions they held. An accompanying note was prepared by  P.A. Baranov and N.P. Dubinin. They however ensured that it went to Khrushchev who was very upset and termed the letter "outrageous."

The letter resulted in the resignation of Lysenko from the position of president of VASKhNIL in 1956 but through Khrushchev's influence he returned to power in 1958-59. It was after the end of Khrushchev's rule in October 1964 that Lysenko lost support. In February 1965, Lysenko was finally dismissed from the institute of genetics.

References 

Pseudoscience
Memoranda
Politics of science
History of biology
Open letters
Science and technology in the Soviet Union
1955 in the Soviet Union